Chhangchhangdi  is a village development committee in Syangja District in the Gandaki Zone of central Nepal. At the time of the 2011 Nepal census it had a population of 2844 people living in 652 individual households.

Chhangchhangdi got its name from Magar language. (Changchang=sound produced by water; di=Water). 
According to holi book Swasthani, Chhangchhangdi is the place of Chaya-kshetra. After Satyawati died, Lord Shiva carried her dead body until it decayed and finished off in the soil. The buttock of Satyawati dropped in famous palace Guheswori whereas last part of Satwati fell in Chhangchhangdi. At that time Lord Shiva became tired and thirsty so he hit the hill with his arrow and drained water to drink it. Still today in Chhangchhangdi-3 there is the waterfall produced by lord Shiva. Every year many Hindu people come to the temple at various occasions especially on Shivaratri, thulo-ekadeshi, etc.

So Chhangchhangdi is good place both as religious and tourism point of view. People are foreign workers in Arabian countries, farmers, businessmen, students, doctors, engineers, army men in Nepal, India and United Kingdom, etc. Changchhangdi is a place of cultural diversity. Brahamin, Kshetriya, Magar, Newar, Dalits, etc. all live in great harmony.

The rapid development of Chhangchhandi occurred after restoration of democracy in 2046 B.S. But still Chhangchhagdi awaits a lot of development. Every ward has road, communication and electricity facilities. It has health facility, schools, local youth clubs, aama-samuha, etc. The VDC office lies in Dhavung-thati. River Adhikhola is border between Changchangdi and Swarek VDC. Dahathum VDC lies at Northeast, Walling Municipality lies at west and southwestern area. Siddhartha highway passes through Chhangchhangdi. Chhangchhangdi got highway connection since more than last 40 years.
The first active leader of Chhangchhangdi VDC is Shobha Kanta "Kancha" Poudel. He is famous for fighting selflessly for democracy. Recently there are few emerging leaders in chhangchhandi.

References

External links
UN map of the municipalities of Syangja District

Populated places in Syangja District